Shama Ishaq Baloch (born ) is a Pakistani politician who was a Member of the Provincial Assembly of Balochistan, from May 2013 to May 2018.

Early life and education

Baloch was born in 1969 in Mastung District.

She has a degree of the Bachelor of Medicine and Bachelor of Surgery from Bolan Medical College.

Political career
Baloch was elected to the Provincial Assembly of Balochistan as a candidate of National Party on a reserved seat for women in 2002 Pakistani general election.

Baloch was re-elected to the Provincial Assembly of Balochistan as a candidate of National Party on a reserved seat for women in 2013 Pakistani general election.

References

Living people
Balochistan MPAs 2013–2018
Balochistan MPAs 2002–2007
1969 births